Riccardo Garrone  may refer to
Riccardo Garrone (actor), (1926–2016) Italian actor
Riccardo Garrone (entrepreneur), (1936–2013) Italian entrepreneur and football chairman